Pink Bomb is a 1993 Hong Kong action comedy film directed by Derek Chiu and starring an ensemble cast  of Waise Lee, Lau Ching-wan, Dayo Wong, Cheung Kwok-leung, Cynthia Khan, Gloria Yip, Loletta Lee and Fennie Yuen.

Plot
Policewoman Leung Chi-kwan (Cynthia Khan), instructor Lee Sin-yee (Loletta Lee), beautician Yip Yuk-hing (Fennie Yuen), taxi driver Daniel (Lau Ching-wan) and former triad member Rascal King (Dayo Wong) goes to Thailand for vacation led by tour guide Graham (Waise Lee), a born again Christian. There, they rescue a prostitute Ann (Gloria Yip) who was beaten up by brothel frequenters for scamming their money. Ann stole a case of money which turns out to be US$3 million counterfeit currency. During the tour, they were constantly being chased by gangsters wanting to silence them. During this critical moment, Graham reveals his true identity as a secret agent.

Cast
Waise Lee as Graham
Cynthia Khan as Leung Chi-kwan
Loletta Lee as Lee Sin-yin
Lau Ching-wan as Daniel
Fennie Yuen as Yip Yuk-hing
Dayo Wong as Rascal King
Cheung Kwok-leung as Fake Cop
Gloria Yip as Ann
Fung Hak-on as Brother Black
Helen Poon
Baby Bo
Ken Lok
Lau Siu-kwan
Ma On
Garry Chan
Jack Wong
Ling Lai-man
Sung Boon-chung
Leung Kai Chi
William Chu as Siu-ming
Hui Sze-man as Siu-ming's mother
San Tak0kan
Ah Sing

Reception

Critical
Love HK Film gave the a mixed review and describes it as "Amusing, but only occasionally. And probably not worth breaking your back to find." City On Fire also gave the film a mixed review and writes "Pink Bomb throws so much nonsense at you, you become mesmerized."

Box office
The film grossed HK$51,329 at the Hong Kong box office during its theatrical run from 27 to 31 March 1993 in Hong Kong.

References

External links

Pink Bomb at Hong Kong Cinemagic

1993 films
1993 action comedy films
1993 martial arts films
Hong Kong action comedy films
Hong Kong martial arts films
Hong Kong martial arts comedy films
1990s spy comedy films
1990s Cantonese-language films
Films set in Thailand
Films shot in Thailand
1993 directorial debut films
Films about prostitution in Thailand
1990s Hong Kong films